Polan  is a surname. Notable people with the surname include:

Jason Polan (1982–2020), American artist
Lincoln M. Polan, the defendant in Kinney Shoe Corp v Polan
Nina Polan (1927–2014), Polish-American actress and theatre director

See also
Polan (disambiguation)